A list of people related to the University of Kent.

Officers
Several positions did not technically exist prior to the formal incorporation of the University by approval of its Charter on 4 January 1965. However several were appointed beforehand as nominal "officer designates", performing the same duties. Princess Marina, Duchess of Kent was not formally installed as Chancellor until 30 March 1966.

Chancellors
1963-1968 Princess Marina, Duchess of Kent
1970-1990 Jo Grimond (later Baron Grimond) - see University of Kent at Canterbury Chancellor election, 1970
1990-1995 Sir Robert Horton
1996-2006 Sir Crispin Tickell
2006-2014 Sir Robert Worcester
2014- Gavin Esler

Vice-Chancellors
1963-1980 Geoffrey Templeman
1980-1994 David J.E. Ingram
1994-2001 Robin Sibson
2001-2007 Sir David Melville
2007-2017 Dame Julia Goodfellow
2017–present Karen Cox

Pro Chancellors

1960-1971 Wykeham Cornwallis, 2nd Baron Cornwallis
1971-1977 Sir Paul Chambers
1977-1984 Robin Leigh-Pemberton
1984-1993 Rt Rev David Say
1993-1999 John Knatchbull, 7th Baron Brabourne
1999-2005 Sir Geoffrey Chipperfield

Title changed to:

Chair of the Council
2005 - 2011 Valerie Marshall
2011 - 2014 John Simmonds
2014–present Sir David Warren

Visitors

The Visitor of the university is the Archbishop of Canterbury ex officio. The following Archbishops have served:

1965-1974 Michael Ramsey (appointed Archbishop 1961)
1974-1980 Donald Coggan
1980-1991 Robert Runcie
1991-2002 George Carey
2002-2012 Rowan Williams
2013–present Justin Welby

Notable staff

Dominic Abrams - Professor of Social Psychology & Vice President of the British Academy
Harry Bloom - South African former political activist, author (deceased)
Upamanyu Chatterjee - author
David Corfield – philosopher
Elizabeth Cowie - professor of film studies at the University of Kent
Frank Furedi - founder and chairman of the Revolutionary Communist Party (RCP), Professor of Sociology
Robin Gill - Anglican priest and theologian
Roy Goodman - freelance conductor, violinist and organist
Matthew Goodwin - professor and researcher of British politics
Abdulrazak Gurnah - writer
Rosalyn Higgins - President of the International Court of Justice
Michael J. L. Kirby - former Canadian Senator
Bill MacMillan - Vice-Chancellor of the University of East Anglia
Molly Mahood - literary scholar
Murray Smith - philosopher and film theorist; Professor of Film at the University of Kent
Hamish Swanston, the first Catholic to head a Department of Theology at a British university since the Reformation
David Turner - computer scientist, designer of the Miranda programming language
Sarah Turner - filmmaker, and Director of Research, School of Music and Fine Art
Glenn White - astronomer
John Zarnecki - space scientist and principal on the Huygens probe

Notable alumni

All Bachelors Degrees unless stated otherwise

Academia

Anuwar Ali - (PhD) - economist; exponent of higher education; second Vice-Chancellor and President of Open University Malaysia
Jo Fox - Director Institute of Historical Research University of London
Adrian Franklin - Professor of Sociology at the University of Tasmania 
Colin Hughes (microbiologist) - Emeritus Professor of Microbiology University of Cambridge Fellow of Trinity College, Cambridge
Belinda Jack - Fellow and Tutor in French at Christ Church, Oxford at the University of Oxford
Homa Katouzian - (PhD) - Professor of Iranian Studies at the University of Oxford
Robert Lethbridge - Former Master of Fitzwilliam College at the University of Cambridge
 Anthony McClaran  - Vice Chancellor St Mary's University, Twickenham.
Lisa Roberts (academic) -(PhD)- Vice Chancellor University of Exeter
Ralph Townsend (MA) - former Headmaster of Winchester College
Patrick Collinson - Notable Elizabethan historian; (PhD) - former Regius Professor of Modern History, University of Cambridge 
Rupert Wegerif - Professor of Education at the University of Cambridge Fellow of Hughes Hall
Lorraine Whitmarsh -   MBE - Environmental Psychologist - Professor at the University of Bath
 John Witheridge - Chaplain to the Queen -  Former Headmaster of Charterhouse School

Theatre film and entertainment

Farah Zeynep Abdullah - Turkish actress and singer including film The Butterfly's Dream
Heather Agyepong - Actor/performer, photographer, visual artist.
Andrew Burt - actor -  the original Jack Sugden in Emmerdale
 Daragh Carville  - Playwright and Screenwriter including The Bay
Jackie Clune - actor, singer, and comedian
Alan Davies - comedian, actor, and author: work includes television QI, Bob & Rose and Jonathan Creek and book Just Ignore Him.
Richard Denton (producer) - Producer and Director of Television documentaries including Comrades and Kingswood  - a Comprehensive.
 Can Evrenol - Turkish Film director including Baskin
Lyn Gardner -  theatre critic, children's writer and journalist, founding member of City Limits magazine, and who contributes reviews and articles to The Stage and was theatre critic at The Guardian for 23 years.
Mark Gillis - actor, including for the Royal Shakespeare Company, writer / director including for the indie film Sink
Stuart Hazeldine - Screenwriter and film director including The Shack
Kim Ismay - actor including Royal Shakespeare Company and singer
Bruce Langley - actor, known for playing the role of Technical Boy on American Gods.
Rebecca Lenkiewicz - Playwright and screenwriter including Ida, Best Foreign Film at the Academy Awards 2015 and She Said (film)
Laura Lexx - comedian and writer
 Megan Swann -  Magician, President The Magic Circle
Paul Telfer - actor, NCIS and Days of Our Lives
Ramon Tikaram - actor, This Life and EastEnders
Neal Purvis and Robert Wade - screenwriters of the film Let Him Have It and eight James Bond films including Casino Royale, Skyfall and No Time to Die
Ariel Vromen - Israeli screenwriter and film director including The Iceman
Tom Wilkinson OBE - actor, including The Full Monty and Academy Award nominee for In the Bedroom and Michael Clayton
CheezyDreach  Youtuber, Prankster, Comedian,, (Dropped out)

Literature
Michael Baigent - (MA) -  co-author of The Holy Blood and the Holy Grail
Valerie Bloom - poet
Debjani Chatterjee - poet
Fred D'Aguiar - novelist, playwright, poet, and academic
Abdulrazak Gurnah (MA) (PhD) - academic and novelist including Paradise and 2021 Nobel Prize in Literature winner
Jane Harper - author The Dry
Sir Kazuo Ishiguro - novelist, Man Booker Prize winner for The Remains of the Day and 2017 Nobel Prize in Literature winner, Screenwriter of Living (2022 film) 
E. L. James - author Fifty Shades of Grey and film producer Fifty Shades of Grey  - one of Time Magazine's 100 most influential people 2012.
David Mitchell - novelist Ghostwritten, Cloud Atlas and Utopia Avenue - one of Time Magazine's 100 most influential people 2007. 
Sarah Waters - novelist Fingersmith and Tipping the Velvet
David Wingrove - Science Fiction writer
Frederick Kambemba Yamusangie - novelist
Musaemura Zimunya - Zimbabwean contemporary author

Media

Rosie Boycott - Baroness Boycott - journalist, former editor of The Independent and Daily Express
Janusz Bugajski -  host of Bugajski Hour on several Balkan TV channels
Ian Collins - radio presenter - TalkRADIO host 
Oliver Double - comedian and comedy historian
Gavin Esler - former BBC Newsnight presenter and BBC North America Editor
Shiulie Ghosh - former ITV news presenter
Fi Glover - BBC Radio 4 presenter including The Listening Project
Charlotte Green - BBC radio presenter, voted "Most Attractive Female Voice on National Radio"
David Horsey - (MA) - Pulitzer Prize-winning cartoonist
Mark Mardell - Presenter The World This Weekend BBC Radio 4 - former BBC North America and Europe Editor
Nick Piercey - BBC Local Radio presenter
Matt Preston - Australian television presenter and food journalist
Carolyn Quinn - BBC Radio 4 political presenter
Paul Ross - journalist and presenter - Former editor and presenter The Big Breakfast
William Sitwell,  former editor of Waitrose magazine now Telegraph columnist and Masterchef presenter
Charlotte Smith (broadcaster)  - Presenter Countryfile and Farming Today.
Peter White (broadcaster) - BBC Radio 4 Presenter You and Yours and BBC Disability Affairs Correspondent
Patrick Wright - journalist, academic and author

Music

 Humphrey Berney  - Classical / Crossover singer formerly with Classic Brit Awards winners Blake (band) now soloist
YolanDa Brown - saxophonist, composer, broadcaster, philanthropist; double MOBO "Best Jazz" winner. Chair BPI music.
Jon DaSilva   - DJ and Record Producer - House and Dance music - pioneer at The Haçienda Manchester.
Ana Free -     Portuguese singer songwriter. 
Barbara Gaskin - singer - recorded No 1 hit single "It's my Party" with Dave Stewart
Ellie Goulding - singer / songwriter (dropped out - did not graduate) albums include Lights (Ellie Goulding album)
Steve Hillage - guitarist (dropped out - did not graduate)
Lami Phillips - Nigerian singer / songwriter and actress
Tiwa Savage - Nigerian singer / songwriter

Business 
 Paul Bennett -  Founder and Chairman The UK Holiday Group
 Sarah Bentley - Chief Executive Officer Thames Water
 Afsaneh Mashayekhi Beschloss  - CEO Rock Creek , Former Chief Investment Officer World Bank, Carnegie Corporation of New York Great Immigrants, Great Americans list 2020
 Stephane Boujnah - (LLM) - Chief Executive Officer and Chairman at Euronext
 Nigel Bostock - Chief Executive Officer Crowe UK
James Buckley-Thorp - Founder and Chief Executive Officer Bequest (company)
Zameer Choudrey, Baron Choudrey - Chief Executive Bestway Group
 Paul Everitt -  Chief Executive Officer ADS Group
 John Garcia   -  Executive Chairman AEA Investors
Wayne Garvie - President International Production at Sony Pictures Television
Tristia Harrison - Chief Executive Officer TalkTalk Group
Max Hole - former Chairman and Chief of Global Operations Universal Music
 Sanjeev Kumar  - Chairman and Chief Executive Prax Group a global integrated oil company. Prax owns and runs the Lindsey Oil Refinery
 Philip Knatchbull - Chief Executive Officer Curzon Cinemas
Carolyn McCall - DBE - Chief Executive Officer ITV
 Chris MacDonald  - Chairman and Chief Executive Officer McCann (company).
 Mike Newnham  - Chief Executive Officer Saint-Gobain UK and Ireland.
 Mark Smith    - Chief Financial Officer Cummins
Charles Wigoder - Executive Chairman Telecom Plus

Politics

Abdullah Md Zin - (PhD) - minister in the Malaysian government
Abbas Araghchi - (PhD) - Deputy Minister for Foreign Affairs of Iran. Lead negotiator for the nuclear technology / sanctions talks between Iran, the USA and Europe.
Azizan Abdul Razak - Menteri Besar (Chief Minister) of the Malaysian state of Kedah
Gareth Bacon -  Conservative Member of Parliament for Orpington - Parliamentary Private Secretary to Minister of State for Brexit Opportunities and Government Efficiency.
Steve Bassam, Baron Bassam of Brighton - (MA) - former Government Whip in the House of Lords
Judith Blake, Baroness Blake of Leeds - former Labour Leader of Leeds City Council
Wayne Caines - Minister of National Security Government of Bermuda
Ronald D. Coleman - (Year abroad) -former United States Representative for Texas
Baron Collins of Highbury - former Labour Party General Secretary
Chris Davies - (MA) - former Liberal Democrat Member of the European Parliament for North West England; former leader of the Liberal Democrats in the European Parliament; former Member of Parliament for Littleborough and Saddleworth
Mark Drakeford - First Minister of Wales
Tamsin Dunwoody - former Labour Member of the National Assembly for Wales for Preseli Pembrokeshire; former minister in the Welsh Assembly Government
Natalie Elphicke - Conservative Member of Parliament for Dover and Parliamentary Private Secretary at the Ministry of Housing, Communities and Local Government
Kishwer Falkner, Baroness Falkner of Margravine (MA) - Liberal Democrat peer
Sheila Gilmore - former Labour Member of Parliament for Edinburgh East
Stephen Gethins -(MA) - former SNP Member of Parliament for North East Fife
Kostis Hatzidakis - (MA) - Minister for the Environment and Energy in the Greek Government
Dame Ann Hercus DCMG - (MA) - New Zealand politician and diplomat
Jane Hutt - Minister for Social Justice  - Senedd
Kamarudin Jaffar - Member of Parliament of Malaysia for Bandar Tun Razak constituency and Deputy Minister of Foreign Affairs
Jean-Charles Larsonneur -  Deputy representing La Republique En Marche! for Finistère in the French National Assembly
David Lepper - former Labour Member of Parliament for Brighton Pavilion
Mastura Mohd Yazid - Member of Parliament for Kuala Kangsar district and Deputy Minister in the Malaysian Government
Munira Mirza - (MA) (Phd) - former Director of the Number 10 Policy Unit
Maria Mezentseva (MA)  - Member of the Ukrainian Parliament
Chris Mole - former Labour Member of Parliament for Ipswich
Raychelle Omamo - Kenyan Cabinet Secretary for Foreign Affairs
Abena Oppong-Asare -  Labour Member of Parliament for Erith and Thamesmead and Shadow Exchequer Secretary to the Treasury
Taiwo Owatemi -  Labour Member of Parliament for Coventry North West and Shadow Minister for Women and Equalities.
Suren Raghavan (MA) (Phd)  -  Sri Lankan politician. Former Governor of Northern Province. Now National List MP for the Parliament of Sri Lanka
Dan Tehan - (MA) -  Australian politician. Minister for Trade, Tourism and Investment in the Morrison Government since 2020
Emily Thornberry - Labour Member of Parliament for Islington South and Finsbury, Shadow Attorney General for England and Wales
Robin Tilbrook - leader and founder of the English Democrats
Tom Vandenkendelaere - (MA)(Phd) - Belgian Member of the European Parliament
Peter Whittle – former Deputy Leader of the UK Independence Party
Alex Yam - Mayor of North West District and Member of the Singapore Parliament for Marsiling-Yew Tee GRC
Fu Ying - (MA) -Chinese former Ambassador to the United Kingdom and Vice Minister for Foreign Affairs.

Law and administration 
Sir David Akers-Jones - (MA) former acting Governor of Hong Kong, 1986/87
Ursula Brennan - Order of the Bath - former Permanent Secretary at the Ministry of Defence and Ministry of Justice (United Kingdom)
 Jonathan Cohen (judge) QC - High Court Judge, Family Division.
Ivo Daalder - President of the Chicago Council on Global Affairs, former United States Permanent Representative to NATO
Luke de Pulford - Human Rights Campaigner - recipient of the Benemerenti Medal 
 Sir Chris Ham - former Chief Executive King's Fund.
 HHJ Mark Lucraft QC  - former Chief Coroner, now Recorder of London, Lead Judge at the Old Bailey.
 Shan Morgan - Permanent Secretary to the Welsh Government
 Damilola Odufuwa - Founder of Nigerian Feminist Coalition and Microfinance specialist.  One of Vogue (magazine)'s 12 Women leaders who changed the World in 2020.
 Sir Hugh Orde OBE - former Chief Constable of the Police Service of Northern Ireland
  David Ringrose  -  Head of Section Digital Transition and External Action - European External Action Service

 Joanna Roper - CMG (Honour) - British Ambassador to the Kingdom of the Netherlands
 Lucy Scott-Moncrieff - CBE - Human Rights and Mental Health lawyer - Past President Law Society of England and Wales
 Dame Glenys Stacey - DBE - Chair Office for Environmental Protection - formerly Chief Executive Ofqual

Sports

Paul Ackford - former England Rugby and British and Irish Lions rugby player, The Sunday Telegraph sports journalist
Adam Ball - former England Under 19 Cricket Captain who played for Kent County Cricket Club
Natasha Brennan - Women's Rugby Union player - Won the gold medal with the 2014 Women's World Cup England Rugby team.
David Fulton - cricketer, former captain of Kent County Cricket Club
Wayne Otto - British Karate Champion - Winner of multiple gold medals at Karate World Championships
Jamie Reeves - (MA) - semi-professional footballer who won the FA Vase twice; pundit on the ESPN Star Sports coverage of the Premier League
 Harry Sayers - Professional Rugby Player: Hong Kong national rugby union team.
Susannah Townsend - Great Britain, England and Canterbury field hockey player, Gold medal winner 2016 Summer Olympics, Bronze medal winner 2020 Summer Olympics

Military

Joshua Leakey - known for courageous actions in the Afghanistan campaign in 2015; recipient of the Victoria Cross (did not graduate - left in the first year to join the British Army)
  Colin Connor  -  former Captain Parachute Regiment . Awarded Military Cross for service at the Battle of Goose Green in the Falklands War.

Miscellaneous
Chris Broad - Youtuber
Tom Frame - (MA)- Australian Christian minister of religion, historian, academic, author, and social commentator
Akaliza Keza Gara - Rwandan IT activist
Rachael House - artist
Philip Howard - Michelin starred chef - The Square and then Elystan Street
Leon McCarron - Northern Irish adventurer, author, filmmaker, broadcaster. Fellow of the Royal Geographic Society.
Duro Olowu - Fashion Designer
Martin Poll (priest) - Canon Chaplain of St George's Chapel Windsor Castle
Stephen Shaw -(MA) - Prisons and Probation Ombudsman for England and Wales
Johnny Yeo - artist and portraitist - his paintings are included in the permanent collection of the National Portrait Gallery, London

References

Kent

Kent-related lists